Douglas L. "Doug" Medin (born June 13, 1944) is the Louis W. Menk Professor of Psychology at Northwestern University in Evanston, Illinois.

Early life and education
Medin first became interested in psychology when he was an eighth-grader in Algona, Iowa. During this time, he and his classmates were sorted into two groups depending on their singing abilities; Medin was assigned to the non-singers' group. He attended Moorhead State College, graduating in 1965 with a B.A. in psychology, and went on to receive his M.A. and Ph.D. in psychology from the University of South Dakota in 1966 and 1968, respectively. His Ph.D. thesis focused on the way that rhesus monkeys perceive shapes.

Career
Medin joined Rockefeller University in 1968 as a postdoctoral fellow, where he became an assistant professor the following year. He remained at Rockefeller until 1978, when he joined the University of Illinois as an associate professor. He joined the faculty of the University of Michigan in 1989, and remained there for three years until joining the faculty of Northwestern University in 1992, because it "held better professional opportunities for his wife, Linda Powers," according to a profile of Medin in the Proceedings of the National Academy of Sciences.

Research
Medin is best known for his research on concepts and categorization. He has also studied the "role of expertise and culture in the conceptual organization of biological categories."

Honors and awards
Medin was inducted into the American Academy of Arts and Sciences in 2002, and into the National Academy of Sciences in 2005.

References

External links

Members of the United States National Academy of Sciences
Living people
Northwestern University faculty
21st-century American psychologists
Minnesota State University Moorhead alumni
University of South Dakota alumni
University of Illinois Urbana-Champaign faculty
Fellows of the Cognitive Science Society
1944 births
People from Algona, Iowa
Fellows of the American Academy of Arts and Sciences
University of Michigan faculty
20th-century American psychologists